Amyema maidenii is a species of flowering plant within the genus Amyema, an epiphytic hemiparasitic plant of the family Loranthaceae native to Australia and found Australia-wide in the inland (but not in Victoria nor Tasmania).

Description
Its inflorescence is composed of two opposite triads, with all the flowers being sessile. The leaves are flat.

Ecology
A. maidenii is found on Acacias.

Taxonomy
The earliest record in an Australian herbarium is MEL 22373491, which was collected in 1860 by Hermann Beckler on the Scropes Range (about 57 km north of Menindee) during the Victorian Exploring expedition. It was first described by Blakely in 1922 as Loranthus maidenii, but in 1962 was placed in the genus Amyema by Barlow.

References

maidenii
Taxa named by William Blakely
Plants described in 1922
Eudicots of Western Australia
Flora of the Northern Territory
Flora of South Australia
Flora of Queensland
Flora of New South Wales
Parasitic plants
Epiphytes